The discography of Taking Back Sunday, an American rock band, consists of seven studio albums, 20 singles, three EPs and one compilation album.

Discography

Studio albums

Live albums

Compilation albums

Video albums

Extended plays

Songs

Singles

Notes

A. "Liar (It Takes One to Know One)" did not chart on the US Billboard Hot 100, but peaked at no. 12 on the Bubbling Under Hot 100 chart.

Original compilation appearances

Videography

References
Citations

Sources

 
 
 

Discographies of American artists
Pop punk group discographies